Leila Abdul Latif is an Iraqi politician who was the Minister of Labour in the Iraqi Interim Government from June 2004 to May 2005. A Shiite Arab from the Banu Tamim tribe, she is a member of the Iraqi National Accord led by Interim Prime Minister, Ayad Allawi.

She joined the Assembly of Independent Democrats led by Adnan Pachachi for the Iraqi legislative election of January 2005. Partly due to a boycott of the election by most Sunni Arabs, the list won no seats.

In May 2005 the new government of Ibrahim al-Jaafari issued arrest warrants against Abdul Latif for financial corruption and "bringing back to the government members of the former regime".

In August 2006, the independent Commission for Public Integrity filed corruption charges against Abdul Latif, before releasing her on bail. She was convicted of a minor offense and given a suspended sentence.

References 

Iraqi National Accord politicians
Assembly of Independent Democrats politicians
Government ministers of Iraq
21st-century Iraqi women politicians
21st-century Iraqi politicians
Living people
Women government ministers of Iraq
Year of birth missing (living people)